Tarazona y el Moncayo is a comarca in the Province of Zaragoza, within the Aragon region of northeastern Spain.

Geography

Tarazona is the capital of and most important city in the Comarca of Tarazona y el Moncayo.

The comarca is located at the western side of Aragon, bordering the autonomous community of Navarre, the Province of Soria in Castile and León, and the autonomous community and province of La Rioja.

The majestic Moncayo Massif dominates the landscape and gives its name to the comarca. Its highest summit is the highest point in the 500 km long Sistema Ibérico range.

Municipalities
Municipalities within the Comarca of Tarazona y el Moncayo include:
Alcalá de Moncayo 
Añón de Moncayo 
El Buste 
Los Fayos 
Grisel 
Litago 
Lituénigo 
Malón 
Novallas 
San Martín de la Virgen de Moncayo 
Santa Cruz de Moncayo 
Tarazona 
Torrellas 
Trasmoz 
Vera de Moncayo  
Vierlas

See also
Moncayo Massif
Comarcas of Aragon

Climate
The climate is dry, continental, with marked seasonal changes, the summers are pleasant and relatively short compared with the long cold winters.

References

External links 
Comarca de Tarazona y el Moncayo
Tierras del Moncayo

Comarcas of Aragon
Geography of the Province of Zaragoza